Mariela is a given name. Notable people with the name include:

Mariela Antoniska (born 1975), Argentine field hockey goalkeeper in the national women's team (won Olympic medals in 2000 & 2004)
Mariela Belski (born 1971), Argentine feminist lawyer and human rights activist
Mariela Castro (born 1962), the director of the Cuban National Center for Sex Education in Havana and an activist for LGBT rights in Cuba
Mariela González (born 1974), Cuban athlete
Mariela Griffor (born 1961), Chilean journalist and poet
Mariela Muñoz (1943–2017), Argentine transsexual activist
Mariela Ortiz (born 1976), American voice actress, DVD coordinator, production assistant who works for ADV Films
Mariela Pérez (born 1946), Venezuelan pageant titleholder

de:Mariela